Luca's Secret is a 1956 romance novel by Ignazio Silone. The romance is set in Marsica, Abruzzo.

1956 novels
Novels by Ignazio Silone
Italian romance novels
Novels set in Italy
Abruzzo